Rachel Anne Imison  (born 16 December 1978) is an Australian field hockey player. She was born in Palmerston North, New Zealand. She won a gold medal at the 2000 Summer Olympics in Sydney.

References

External links

1978 births
Living people
Sportspeople from Palmerston North
Australian female field hockey players
Female field hockey goalkeepers
Olympic field hockey players of Australia
Field hockey players at the 2000 Summer Olympics
Field hockey players at the 2004 Summer Olympics
Field hockey players at the 2008 Summer Olympics
Olympic gold medalists for Australia
Olympic medalists in field hockey
Medalists at the 2000 Summer Olympics
Commonwealth Games medallists in field hockey
Commonwealth Games gold medallists for Australia
Commonwealth Games bronze medallists for Australia
Field hockey players at the 1998 Commonwealth Games
Field hockey players at the 2002 Commonwealth Games
Field hockey players at the 2006 Commonwealth Games
Recipients of the Medal of the Order of Australia
Medallists at the 1998 Commonwealth Games
Medallists at the 2002 Commonwealth Games
Medallists at the 2006 Commonwealth Games